José de Carvajal y Hué (8 October 1835 in Málaga, Spain – 4 June 1899 in Madrid, Spain) was a Spanish lawyer, economist, writer and politician who served as Minister of State from 1873 to 1874, during the presidency of Emilio Castelar y Ripoll in the First Spanish Republic.

References
www.xtec.es José de Carvajal Hué

|-
 

Foreign ministers of Spain
People from Málaga
Spanish economists
19th-century Spanish lawyers
Economy and finance ministers of Spain
1835 births
1899 deaths
Government ministers during the First Spanish Republic